Raghunath Temple, Srinagar is a Hindu temple located in Srinagar in the union territory of Jammu and Kashmir. Construction started under Maharaja Gulab Singh in 1835 and was completed in 1860 by Maharaja Ranbir Singh. The temple was attacked and later abandoned following the exodus of Kashmiri Hindus from Kashmir valley. The abandoned temple is being restored.

References 

Hindu temples in Jammu and Kashmir